Eleutherengonides is a group of mites, ranked as a "supercohort", between the taxonomic rank of order and family.

Superfamilies and families
 Paratydeidae
 Eriophyoidea
 Iolinoidea
 Heterostigmatina
 Athyreacaridae
 Crotalorphidae
 Fembidiacaridae
 Dolichocyboidea
 Heterocheyletoidea
 Pyematoidea
 Pygmephoroidea
 Scutacaroidea
 Tarsocheyloidea
 Tarsonemoidea
 Trochometridioidea
 Raphignathae
 Cheyletoidea
 Pomerantzioidea
 Pterygosomatoidea
 Raphignathoidea
 Tetranychoidea

References

Trombidiformes